The 2019–20 Rugby Europe International Championships is the European Championship for tier 2 and tier 3 rugby union nations. The 2019–20 season is the third of its new format and structure, where all Levels play on a one-year cycle, replacing the old format of a two-year cycle, with the teams playing each other both home and away.

After their win against Germany in the relegation play-off of the 2019 Championship season, Portugal was promoted to the Championship for 2020.

On 12 March 2020, as a result of the COVID-19 pandemic, Rugby Europe announced a suspension of all its matches and tournaments from 13 March 2020 until 15 April 2020. On 26 March, Rugby Europe decided to extend the suspension of all its matches and tournaments indefinitely. On 8 April, Rugby Europe Board of Directors decided to call off the season of Men's Senior XV Conference 1, Conference 2 and Development. There will be no promotion or relegation this year. The same pools will be kept for the 2020–21 season. On 20 October 2020, following the resurgence of COVID-19 pandemic across Europe and local authority restrictions, Rugby Europe has announced a suspension of all matches planned until the end of November 2020.

Countries
Pre-tournament World Rugby rankings in parentheses. Conference as of 16 September 2019. Trophy as of 21 October 2019. After winning the relegation play-off between the winner of the 2019 Trophy, Portugal, and the last placed 2019 Championship team, Germany, and the win by the former Germany were relegated to the Trophy level, whereas Portugal was promoted to the Championship. Following the 2018–19 season and the promotion of Turkey as well as the relegation of Slovakia, Rugby Europe no changes to the reallocated groups were made, after last year's switch by Austria from Conference 2 South to Conference 2 North for the 2018–19 Conference season.

Championship
  (27)
  * (12)
  ↑ (21)
  (20)
  (18)
  (19)

Conference 1
North
  ↓ (38)
    (68)
  ↑ (57)
    (59)
    (50)

Conference 2
North
  ‡ (88)
    (78)
    (90)
  ↓ (55)
    (95)

Development 
 
 
 
  ↓

Trophy
  ↓ (28)
    (37)
    (25)
    (35)
    (30)
  ↑ (38)

South
    (47)
    (NR)
    (61)
  • (39)
  ↑ (71)

South
    (76)
  ↓ (73)
    (87)
    (85)
  ↑ (NR)

Legend:* Champion of 2018–19 season; ↑ Promoted from lower division during 2018–19 season; • Division Champion but not promoted during 2018–19 season; ‡ Last place inside own division but not relegated during 2018–19 season; ↓ Relegated from higher division during 2018–19 season

2020 Rugby Europe Championship

2019–20 Rugby Europe Trophy

2019–20 Rugby Europe Conference

Conference 1

Conference 1 North

Conference 1 South

Conference 2

Conference 2 North

Conference 2 South

2020 Rugby Europe Development

Play-offs

Championship–Trophy promotion play-off

Trophy–Conference 1 promotion play-off

References

 
2019-20
2019–20 in European rugby union
Europe
Europe